Fuller Waterfalls are located in a town called Yabraso, 7 km West of Kintampo, Ghana. They are estimated to be 173 meters above sea level, falling gently over a series of cascades along river Oyoko at Yabraso (tributary of the Black Volta).

The falls were discovered in 1988 by a Filipino missionary, Rev. Fr. Joseph Panabang. Following that, Father Panabang and his people used the place as a prayer ground and named it  “Our Lady of Kintampo”, until 1998 when he departed from the town.

See also
 Fuller Waterfalls, Ghana

References 

Waterfalls of Ghana